The 2018 Iranian protests was a series of protests and massive nonviolent demonstrations across Iran throughout late-2018 against worsening tensions and deteriorating conditions as part of the 2018-2019 Iranian general strikes and protests.

Background
Protests occurred in the 2017-2018 Iranian protests and massive protests and opposition strikes, rallies and demonstrations occurred as well, starting in Mashhad and spread nationwide due to the price of eggs, Inflation, soaring prices for food and water and gas and many more issues. The civilians again had had enough of the conditions.

Protests and nationwide trucker demonstrations and public driver strikes was the initial protests and revolt against state-led propaganda and lying to drivers over paid wages. Anger over unchanged transportation fees and increased costs, protests erupted and truckers relaunched nationwide and countrywide demonstrations calling for the government to note their main and focal opposition demands. Hundreds of mill workers reportedly took to the streets while Rail workers were on strike in August as well.

Protests
September

On 11 September 2018, shopkeepers in Iranian Kurdistan initiated a one-day strike in response to the missile attack by the Iranian Revolutionary Guard Corps on the headquarters of the Kurdistan Democratic Party of Iran, and the execution of Ramin Panahi and two other Kurd activists. In response to the strikes, the security forces arrested five Kurdish activists.

On 22 September 2018, truckers across several Iranian cities restarted their strikes against the rising expenses of their jobs. On 26 September, the strikes continued and were seen in Ahvaz, Qazvin, Shahreza, Borujerd, and Urmia. 40 to 70 truckers in Fars, Tehran, and Qazvin province were arrested on 27 September, as strikes continued into their fifth day. The Free Truckers Union announced that the strike had spread to 31 provinces across the country. The judiciary stated that those arrested could face the death penalty. On 29 September, on the eight day of the strikes, the number of truckers arrested reached 89.

October

On 1 October, the truckers strikes reached their 10th straight day and were seen in Bukan, Khosrowshah, Arak, Fooladshahr, Nishapur, Tiran, Takestan, Kermanshah, Sanandaj, Qazvin, Karaj, Bandar Abbas, Ardabil, Dezful, Yazd, and Najafabad. The number of arrested also reached 156. By the 13th straight day of the strike over 230 truckers were arrested. The strikes continued into 8 October, and reached their 17th consecutive day. Security forces responded by arresting a number of truckers, which increased the number of people arrested to 256. On the same day, Bazaars in multiple cities across Iran closed their shops and went on strike in protest to the economic situation. Strikes were seen in Sanandaj, Bukan, Saqqez, Marivan, Baneh, Miandoab, Tehran, Isfahan, Mashhad, Tabriz, and Chabahar. The strikes continued into 9 October, although they were reduced in size from the previous day, and were seen in Tabriz, Shahriar, Shahreza, and Sanandaj.

On 13 October 2018, teachers across Iran started a two-day nationwide strike in protest to high expenses and inflation. Teachers in Tehran, Mashhad, Tabriz, Isfahan, Shiraz, Kermanshah, Ilam, Yasuj, Sanandaj, Simorgh, Hamedan, Amol, Zarrin Shahr, Gonabad, Eslamabad, Torbat-e Heydarieh, Marivan, Sarvabad, and Garmeh, went on strike. At least two teachers were arrested on the first day of the strike.

Teachers went on strike for a second day on 14 October.

November

On 1 November 2018, truckers in Tehran, Zanjan, Isfahan, Asaluyeh, Nahavand, and Shahrud went on strike for the fourth time this year in protest to the arrest of hundreds of truckers in October. Workers from several factories in Iran have been on constant strikes due to unpaid wages and inflation. On 2 November 2018, workers at the Haft Tappeh Cane Sugar Company's factory in Shush start their own strikes.

On 13 and 14 November, Iranian teachers in most provinces went on strike for the second time in 2018. Thirteen teachers were arrested during this strike.

On 15 November, the workers strikes escalated and protests spilled onto the streets of Shush. Some workers in Shush called for the factory to be operated by a workers council. The following day, the workers disrupted the Friday Prayer service of the city. They chanted "Hossein, Hossein is their cry, theft is their pride", "Death to oppressors, long live workers", and "Workers are willing to die, but will not accept oppression". Protests continued in the streets of Shush on 17 November, despite the presence of the security forces and riot police.

On the same day, hundreds of workers of the Foolad Company in Ahvaz protested in front of the Governor's office. Protestors in Ahvaz chanted "Let go of Kashoggi, think of us", and "Inflation, increasing prices, be responsible Rouhani". On 18 November, nineteen protestors were arrested in Shush. By 21 November , thirteen of the protesters in Shush were released from prison, the arrested protestors faced charges of "acting against the regime". On 24 November, workers joined by ordinary citizens, protested in Ahvaz and clashed with the security forces. On the same day, workers of the vegetable oil factory of Zanjan protested in front of the governor's office in Zanjan due to unpaid wages. On 28 November, workers protested for the 24th consecutive day in Shush, despite the city's police commander stating that any gatherings were against the law. Protests occurred in Ahvaz on the same day, as thousands of workers took to the streets.

On 18 November 2018 Workers Syndicate at the Haft Tappeh sugar mill in Iran’s Khuzestan province announced that the security forces had arrested two of their representatives, Esmail Bakhshi and Mohsen Armand. The syndicate also announced that on 29 November 2018 government forces arrested its senior member Ali Nejati in his house.

December

On 4 December, workers in Ahvaz protested for the 25th straight day, and chanted "Palestine and Syria are the root of our problems". On 17 December, the security forces cracked-down and arrested 31 workers in Ahvaz whom they identified as the leaders of the protests. The day before workers had gathered in Ahvaz and declared that they would take their protest to the capital Tehran, if their demands were not met.  On 13 December, Ali Nejati, was transferred to hospital, after long and distressing interrogations.

On 18 December, a lone protester on the island of Kish, stood in front of the main square of the city and graffitied anti-regime and pro-worker slogans, which included: "Imprisoned workers must be freed", and "long live the Shah". On 18 and 19 December 2018 the security forces stormed the houses of Foolad workers in Khuzestan province and arrested up to 41 workers.

15 workers at Ilam Petrochemical Plant in central western Iran were convicted to six months’ imprisonment and 74 lashes by a state court after they gathered in protest outside the factory for their fellow experienced workers being laid off. The court charged them with “disrupting public order and peace”.

On 21 December, truck drivers across the country started their fifth round of nationwide strikes in protest to inflation and rising expenses.

On 27 December 2018 Security forces attacked with tear gas a teachers gathering outside the education office in Isfahan, central Iran. Teachers were protesting their low salary and the arrest of their colleagues who were now in jail.

See also
 2019 protests in Iran

References

2018 in Iran
General strikes in Asia
2018 protests
Protests in Iran